Maksim Gruznov (born 21 April 1974 in Narva) is a retired Estonian football striker.

Gruznov became the Meistriliiga top goalscorer in 1993/94 and then repeated his success in 2001 and 2006 seasons.

Gruznov is the Meistriliiga all-time top scorer with 304 goals. He was also the appearance leader before Stanislav Kitto beat it.

Honours

Club
 FC Lantana Tallinn
 Estonian Top Division: 1995–96, 1996–97
 Estonian SuperCup: 1997–98
 FC Trans Narva
 Estonian Cup: 2000–01
 Estonian SuperCup: 2007, 2008

Individual
 Meistriliiga top scorer: 1993–94, 2001, 2006

References

External links
 Player profile on www.fctrans.ee

1974 births
Living people
Sportspeople from Narva
FC Lantana Tallinn players
Estonian people of Russian descent
Association football forwards
JK Sillamäe Kalev players
FC TVMK players
JK Narva Trans players
Estonian footballers
Meistriliiga players